Marrakesh or Marrakech ( or ; ,) is the fourth largest city in the Kingdom of Morocco. It is one of the four Imperial cities of Morocco and is the capital of the Marrakesh-Safi region. The city is situated west of the foothills of the Atlas Mountains.

The region has been inhabited by Berber farmers since Neolithic times. The city was founded in 1070 by Emir Abu Bakr ibn Umar as the imperial capital of the Almoravid Empire. The Almoravids established the first major structures in the city and shaped its layout for centuries to come. The red walls of the city, built by Ali ibn Yusuf in 1122–1123, and various buildings constructed in red sandstone afterwards, have given the city the nickname of the "Red City" ( Almadinat alhamra''') or "Ochre City". Marrakesh grew rapidly and established itself as a cultural, religious, and trading center for the Maghreb and sub-Saharan Africa. Jemaa el-Fnaa is the busiest square in Africa.

After a period of decline, the city was surpassed by Fez, and in the early 16th century, Marrakesh again became the capital of the kingdom. The city regained its preeminence under wealthy Saadian sultans Abdallah al-Ghalib and Ahmad al-Mansur, who embellished the city with sumptuous palaces such as the El Badi Palace (1578) and restored many ruined monuments. Beginning in the 17th century, the city became popular among Sufi pilgrims for its seven patron saints who are entombed here. In 1912 the French Protectorate in Morocco was established and T'hami El Glaoui became Pasha of Marrakesh and held this position nearly throughout the protectorate until the role was dissolved upon the independence of Morocco and the reestablishment of the monarchy in 1956.

Marrakesh comprises an old fortified city packed with vendors and their stalls. This medina quarter is a UNESCO World Heritage Site. Today it is one of the busiest cities in Africa and serves as a major economic center and tourist destination. Real estate and hotel development in Marrakesh have grown dramatically in the 21st century. Marrakesh is particularly popular with the French, and numerous French celebrities own property in the city. Marrakesh has the largest traditional market (souk) in Morocco, with some 18 souks selling wares ranging from traditional Berber carpets to modern consumer electronics. Crafts employ a significant percentage of the population, who primarily sell their products to tourists.

Marrakesh is served by Ménara International Airport and by Marrakesh railway station, which connects the city to Casablanca and northern Morocco. Marrakesh has several universities and schools, including Cadi Ayyad University. A number of Moroccan football clubs are here, including Najm de Marrakech, KAC Marrakech, Mouloudia de Marrakech and Chez Ali Club de Marrakech. The Marrakesh Street Circuit hosts the World Touring Car Championship, Auto GP and FIA Formula Two Championship races.

Etymology
The exact meaning of the name is debated. One possible origin of the name Marrakesh is from the Berber (Amazigh) words amur (n) akush (ⴰⵎⵓⵔ ⵏ ⴰⴽⵓⵛ), which means "Land of God". According to historian Susan Searight, however, the town's name was first documented in an 11th-century manuscript in the Qarawiyyin library in Fez, where its meaning was given as "country of the sons of Kush". The word mur  is used now in Berber mostly in the feminine form tamurt. The same word "mur" appears in Mauretania, the North African kingdom from antiquity, although the link remains controversial as this name possibly originates from μαύρος mavros, the ancient Greek word for black. The common English spelling is "Marrakesh", although "Marrakech" (the French spelling) is also widely used. The name is spelled Mṛṛakc in the Berber Latin alphabet, Marraquexe in Portuguese, Marrakech in Spanish. A typical pronunciation in Moroccan Arabic is marrākesh with stress on the second syllable, while vowels in the other syllables may be barely pronounced.

From medieval times until around the beginning of the 20th century, the entire country of Morocco was known as the "Kingdom of Marrakesh", as the kingdom's historic capital city was often Marrakesh. The name for Morocco is still "Marrakesh" to this day in Persian and Urdu as well as many other South Asian languages. Various European names for Morocco (Marruecos, Marrocos, Maroc, Marokko, etc.) are directly derived from the Berber word Murakush. Conversely, the city itself was in earlier times simply called Marocco City (or similar) by travelers from abroad. The name of the city and the country diverged after the Treaty of Fez divided Morocco into a French protectorate in Morocco and Spanish protectorate in Morocco, and the old interchangeable usage lasted widely until about the interregnum of Mohammed Ben Aarafa (1953–1955). The latter episode set in motion the country's return to independence, when Morocco officially became  (al-Mamlaka al-Maġribiyya, "The Maghreb Kingdom"), its name no longer referring to the city of Marrakesh. Marrakesh is known by a variety of nicknames, including the "Red City", the "Ochre City" and "the Daughter of the Desert", and has been the focus of poetic analogies such as one comparing the city to "a drum that beats an African identity into the complex soul of Morocco."

History

The Marrakesh area was inhabited by Berber farmers from Neolithic times, and numerous stone implements have been unearthed in the area. Marrakesh was founded by Abu Bakr ibn Umar, chieftain and second cousin of the Almoravid king Yusuf ibn Tashfin (c. 1061–1106). Historical sources cite a variety of dates for this event ranging between 1062 (454 in the Hijri calendar), according to Ibn Abi Zar and Ibn Khaldun, and 1078 (470 AH), according to Muhammad al-Idrisi. The date most commonly used by modern historians is 1070, although 1062 is still cited by some writers. The Almoravids, a Berber dynasty seeking to reform Islamic society, ruled an emirate stretching from the edge of Senegal to the centre of Spain and from the Atlantic coast to Algiers. They used Marrakesh as their capital and established its first structures, including mosques and a fortified residence, the Ksar al-Hajjar, near the present-day Kutubiyya Mosque. These Almoravid foundations also influenced the layout and urban organization of the city for centuries to come. For example, the present-day Jemaa el-Fnaa originated from a public square in front of the Almoravid palace gates, the Rahbat al-Ksar, and the major souks (markets) of the city developed roughly in the area between this square and the city's main mosque, where they remain today. The city developed the community into a trading centre for the Maghreb and sub-Saharan Africa. It grew rapidly and established itself as a cultural and religious centre, supplanting Aghmat, which had long been the capital of Haouz. Andalusi craftsmen from Cordoba and Seville built and decorated numerous monuments, importing the Cordoban Umayyad style characterised by carved domes and cusped arches. This Andalusian influence merged with designs from the Sahara and West Africa, creating a unique style of architecture which was fully adapted to the Marrakesh environment. Yusuf ibn Tashfin built houses, minted coins, and brought gold and silver to the city in caravans. His son and successor, Ali Ibn Yusuf, built the Ben Youssef Mosque, the city's main mosque, between 1120 and 1132. He also fortified the city with city walls for the first time in 1126–1127 and expanded its water supply by creating the underground water system known as the khettara.

In 1125, the preacher Ibn Tumart settled in Tin Mal in the mountains to the south of Marrakesh, founding the Almohad movement. This new faction, composed mainly of Masmuda tribesmen, followed a doctrine of radical reform with Ibn Tumart as the mahdi, a messianic figure. He preached against the Almoravids and influenced a revolt which succeeded in bringing about the fall of nearby Aghmat, but stopped short of bringing down Marrakesh following an unsuccessful siege in 1130. Ibn Tumart died shortly after in the same year, but his successor Abd al-Mu'min took over the political leadership of the movement and captured Marrakesh in 1147 after a siege of several months. The Almohads purged the Almoravid population over three days and established the city as their new capital. They went on to take over much of the Almoravids' former territory in Africa and the Iberian Peninsula. In 1147, shortly after the city's conquest, Abd al-Mu'min founded the Kutubiyya Mosque (or Koutoubia Mosque), next to the former Almoravid palace, to serve as the city's new main mosque. The Almoravid mosques were either demolished or abandoned as the Almohads enacted their religious reforms. Abd al-Mu'min was also responsible for establishing the Menara Gardens in 1157, while his successor Abu Ya'qub Yusuf (r. 1163–1184) began the Agdal Gardens. Ya'qub al-Mansur (r. 1184–1199), possibly on the orders of his father Abu Ya'qub Yusuf, was responsible for building the Kasbah, a citadel and palace district on the south side of the city. The Kasbah housed the center of government and the residence of the caliph, a title borne by the Almohad rulers to rival the eastern Abbasid Caliphate. In part because of these various additions, the Almohads also improved the water supply system and created water reservoirs to irrigate their gardens. Thanks to its economic, political, and cultural importance, Marrakesh hosted many writers, artists, and intellectuals, many of them from Al-Andalus, including the famous philosopher Averroes of Cordoba.

The death of Yusuf II in 1224 began a period of instability. Marrakesh became the stronghold of the Almohad tribal sheikhs and the ahl ad-dar (descendants of Ibn Tumart), who sought to claw power back from the ruling Almohad family. Marrakesh was taken, lost and retaken by force multiple times by a stream of caliphs and pretenders, such as during the brutal seizure of Marrakesh by the Sevillan caliph Abd al-Wahid II al-Ma'mun in 1226, which was followed by a massacre of the Almohad tribal sheikhs and their families and a public denunciation of Ibn Tumart's doctrines by the caliph from the pulpit of the Kasbah Mosque. After al-Ma'mun's death in 1232, his widow attempted to forcibly install her son, acquiring the support of the Almohad army chiefs and Spanish mercenaries with the promise to hand Marrakesh over to them for the sack. Hearing of the terms, the people of Marrakesh sought to make an agreement with the military captains and saved the city from destruction with a sizable payoff of 500,000 dinars. In 1269, Marrakesh was conquered by nomadic Zenata tribes who overran the last of the Almohads. The city then fell into a state of decline, which soon led to the loss of its status as capital to rival city Fez.

In the early 16th century, Marrakesh again became the capital of Morocco, after a period when it was the seat of the Hintata emirs. It quickly reestablished its status, especially during the reigns of the Saadian sultans Abdallah al-Ghalib and Ahmad al-Mansur. Thanks to the wealth amassed by the Sultans, Marrakesh was embellished with sumptuous palaces while its ruined monuments were restored. El Badi Palace, begun by Ahmad al-Mansur in 1578, was made with costly materials including marble from Italy. The palace was intended primarily for hosting lavish receptions for ambassadors from Spain, England, and the Ottoman Empire, showcasing Saadian Morocco as a nation whose power and influence reached as far as the borders of Niger and Mali. Under the Saadian dynasty, Marrakesh regained its former position as a point of contact for caravan routes from the Maghreb, the Mediterranean and sub-Saharan Africa. 

For centuries Marrakesh has been known as the location of the tombs of Morocco's seven patron saints (sebaatou rizjel). When sufism was at the height of its popularity during the late 17th-century reign of Moulay Ismail, the festival of these saints was founded by Abu Ali al-Hassan al-Yusi at the request of the sultan. The tombs of several renowned figures were moved to Marrakesh to attract pilgrims, and the pilgrimage associated with the seven saints is now a firmly established institution. Pilgrims visit the tombs of the saints in a specific order, as follows: Sidi Yusuf Ali Sanhaji (1196–97), a leper; Qadi Iyyad or qadi of Ceuta (1083–1149), a theologian and author of Ash-Shifa (treatises on the virtues of Muhammad); Sidi Bel Abbas (1130–1204), known as the patron saint of the city and most revered in the region; Sidi Muhammad al-Jazuli (1465), a well known Sufi who founded the Jazuli brotherhood; Abdelaziz al-Tebaa (1508), a student of al-Jazuli; Abdallah al-Ghazwani (1528), known as Moulay al-Ksour; and Sidi Abu al-Qasim Al-Suhayli, (1185), also known as Imam al-Suhayli. Until 1867, European Christians were not authorized to enter the city unless they acquired special permission from the sultan; east European Jews were permitted.

During the early 20th century, Marrakesh underwent several years of unrest. After the premature death in 1900 of the grand vizier Ba Ahmed, who had been designated regent until the designated sultan Abd al-Aziz became of age, the country was plagued by anarchy, tribal revolts, the plotting of feudal lords, and European intrigues. In 1907, Marrakesh caliph Moulay Abd al-Hafid was proclaimed sultan by the powerful tribes of the High Atlas and by Ulama scholars who denied the legitimacy of his brother, Abd al-Aziz. It was also in 1907 that Dr. Mauchamp, a French doctor, was murdered in Marrakesh, suspected of spying for his country. France used the event as a pretext for sending its troops from the eastern Moroccan town of Oujda to the major metropolitan center of Casablanca in the west. The French colonial army encountered strong resistance from Ahmed al-Hiba, a son of Sheikh Ma al-'Aynayn, who arrived from the Sahara accompanied by his nomadic Reguibat tribal warriors. On 30 March 1912, the French Protectorate in Morocco was established. After the Battle of Sidi Bou Othman, which saw the victory of the French Mangin column over the al-Hiba forces in September 1912, the French seized Marrakesh. The conquest was facilitated by the rallying of the Imzwarn tribes and their leaders from the powerful Glaoui family, leading to a massacre of Marrakesh citizens in the resulting turmoil.

T'hami El Glaoui, known as "Lord of the Atlas", became Pasha of Marrakesh, a post he held virtually throughout the 44-year duration of the Protectorate (1912–1956). Glaoui dominated the city and became famous for his collaboration with the general residence authorities, culminating in a plot to dethrone Mohammed Ben Youssef (Mohammed V) and replace him with the Sultan's cousin, Ben Arafa. Glaoui, already known for his amorous adventures and lavish lifestyle, became a symbol of Morocco's colonial order. He could not, however, subdue the rise of nationalist sentiment, nor the hostility of a growing proportion of the inhabitants. Nor could he resist pressure from France, who agreed to terminate its Moroccan Protectorate in 1956 due to the launch of the Algerian War (1954–1962) immediately following the end of the war in Indochina (1946–1954), in which Moroccans had been conscripted to fight in Vietnam on behalf of the French Army. After two successive exiles to Corsica and Madagascar, Mohammed Ben Youssef was allowed to return to Morocco in November 1955, bringing an end to the despotic rule of Glaoui over Marrakesh and the surrounding region. A protocol giving independence to Morocco was then signed on 2 March 1956 between French Foreign Minister Christian Pineau and M’Barek Ben Bakkai.

Since the independence of Morocco, Marrakesh has thrived as a tourist destination. In the 1960s and early 1970s, the city became a trendy "hippie mecca". It attracted numerous western rock stars and musicians, artists, film directors and actors, models, and fashion divas, leading tourism revenues to double in Morocco between 1965 and 1970. Yves Saint Laurent, The Beatles, The Rolling Stones and Jean-Paul Getty all spent significant time in the city; Laurent bought a property here and renovated the Majorelle Gardens. Expatriates, especially those from France, have invested heavily in Marrakesh since the 1960s and developed many of the riads and palaces. Old buildings were renovated in the Old Medina, new residences and commuter villages were built in the suburbs, and new hotels began to spring up.

United Nations agencies became active in Marrakesh beginning in the 1970s, and the city's international political presence has subsequently grown. In 1985, UNESCO declared the old town area of Marrakesh a UNESCO World Heritage Site, raising international awareness of the cultural heritage of the city. In the 1980s, Patrick Guerand-Hermes purchased the  Ain el Quassimou, built by the family of Leo Tolstoy.  On 15 April 1994, the Marrakesh Agreement was signed here to establish the World Trade Organisation, and in March 1997 Marrakesh served as the site of the World Water Council's first World Water Forum, which was attended by over 500 international participants.

In the 21st century, property and real estate development in the city has boomed, with a dramatic increase in new hotels and shopping centres, fuelled by the policies of Mohammed VI of Morocco, who aims to increase the number of tourists annually visiting Morocco to 20 million by 2020. In 2010, a major gas explosion occurred in the city. On 28 April 2011, a bomb attack took place in the Jemaa el-Fnaa square, killing 15 people, mainly foreigners. The blast destroyed the nearby Argana Cafe. Police sources arrested three suspects and claimed the chief suspect was loyal to Al-Qaeda, although Al-Qaeda in the Islamic Maghreb denied involvement. In November 2016 the city hosted the 2016 United Nations Climate Change Conference.

Geography

The city has expanded north from the old centre with suburbs such as Daoudiat, Diour El Massakine, Sidi Abbad, Sakar and Amerchich, to the southeast with Sidi Youssef Ben Ali, to the west with Massira and Targa, and southwest to M'hamid beyond the airport. On the P2017 road leading south out of the city are large villages such as Douar Lahna, Touggana, Lagouassem, and Lahebichate, leading eventually through desert to the town of Tahnaout at the edge of the High Atlas, the highest mountainous barrier in North Africa. The average elevation of the snow-covered High Atlas lies above . It is mainly composed of Jurassic limestone. The mountain range runs along the Atlantic coast, then rises to the east of Agadir and extends northeast into Algeria before disappearing into Tunisia.

The city is located in the Tensift River valley, with the Tensift River passing along the northern edge of the city. The "silvery valley of the Ourika river curving north towards Marrakesh", and the "red heights of Jebel Yagour still capped with snow" to the south are sights in this area. David Prescott Barrows, who describes Marrakesh as Morocco's "strangest city", describes the landscape in the following terms: "The city lies some fifteen or twenty miles [25–30 km] from the foot of the Atlas mountains, which here rise to their grandest proportions. The spectacle of the mountains is superb. Through the clear desert air the eye can follow the rugged contours of the range for great distances to the north and eastward. The winter snows mantle them with white, and the turquoise sky gives a setting for their grey rocks and gleaming caps that is of unrivaled beauty."

With 130,000 hectares of greenery and over 180,000 palm trees in its Palmeraie, Marrakesh is an oasis of rich plant variety. Throughout the seasons, fragrant orange, fig, pomegranate and olive trees display their color and fruits in Agdal Garden, Menara Garden and other gardens in the city. The city's gardens feature numerous native plants alongside other species that have been imported over the course of the centuries, including giant bamboos, yuccas, papyrus, palm trees, banana trees, cypress, philodendrons, rose bushes, bougainvilleas, pines and various kinds of cactus plants.

 Climate 
A hot semi-arid climate (Köppen climate classification BSh) predominates at Marrakesh. The relatively wet winter and dry summer precipitation pattern of Marrakesh mirrors precipitation patterns found in Mediterranean climates. However, the city receives less rain than is typically found in a Mediterranean climate, resulting in a semi-arid climate classification. Between 1961 and 1990 the city averaged  of precipitation annually. Barrows says of the climate, "The region of Marrakesh is frequently described as desert in character, but, to one familiar with the southwestern parts of the United States, the locality does not suggest the desert, rather an area of seasonal rainfall, where moisture moves underground rather than by surface streams, and where low brush takes the place of the forests of more heavily watered regions. The location of Marrakesh on the north side of the Atlas, rather than the south, prevents it from being described as a desert city, and it remains the northern focus of the Saharan lines of communication, and its history, its types of dwellers, and its commerce and arts, are all related to the great south Atlas spaces that reach further into the Sahara desert."

 Climate change 
A 2019 paper published in PLOS One estimated that under Representative Concentration Pathway 4.5, a "moderate" scenario of climate change where global warming reaches ~ by 2100, the climate of Marrakesh in the year 2050 would most closely resemble the current climate of Bir Lehlou in Western Sahara.

 Water 
Marrakesh's water supply relies partly on groundwater resources, which have lowered gradually over the last 40 years, attaining an acute decline in the early 2000s. Since 2002, groundwater levels have dropped by an average of 0.9 m per year in 80% of Marrakesh and its surrounding area. The most affected area experienced a drop of 37 m (more than 2 m per year).

Demographics
According to the 2014 census, the population of Marrakesh was 928,850 against 843,575 in 2004. The number of households in 2014 was 217,245 against 173,603 in 2004.

Economy

Marrakesh is a vital component of the economy and culture of Morocco. Improvements to the highways from Marrakesh to Casablanca, Agadir and the local airport have led to a dramatic increase in tourism in the city, which now attracts over two million tourists annually. Because of the importance of tourism to Morocco's economy, King Mohammed VI vowed in 2012 to double the number of tourists, attracting 20 million a year to Morocco by 2020. The city is popular with the French, and many French celebrities have bought property in the city, including fashion moguls Yves St Laurent and Jean-Paul Gaultier. In the 1990s very few foreigners lived in the city, and real estate developments have dramatically increased in the last 15 years; by 2005 over 3,000 foreigners had purchased properties in the city, lured by its culture and the relatively cheap house prices. It has been cited in French weekly magazine Le Point as the second St Tropez: "No longer simply a destination for a scattering of adventurous elites, bohemians or backpackers seeking Arabian Nights fantasies, Marrakech is becoming a desirable stopover for the European jet set." Many enterprises in the city are facing colossal debt problems.

Despite the global economic crisis that began in 2007, investments in real estate progressed substantially in 2011 both in the area of tourist accommodation and social housing. The main developments have been in facilities for tourists including hotels and leisure centres such as golf courses and health spas, with investments of 10.9 billion dirham (US$1.28 billion) in 2011. The hotel infrastructure in recent years has experienced rapid growth. In 2012, alone, 19 new hotels were scheduled to open, a development boom often compared to Dubai. Royal Ranches Marrakech, one of Gulf Finance House's flagship projects in Morocco, is a  resort under development in the suburbs and one of the world's first five star Equestrian Resorts. The resort is expected to make a significant contribution to the local and national economy, creating many jobs and attracting thousands of visitors annually; as of April 2012 it was about 45% complete.
The Avenue Mohammed VI, formerly Avenue de France, is a major city thoroughfare. It has seen rapid development of residential complexes and many luxury hotels. Avenue Mohammed VI contains what is claimed to be Africa's largest nightclub: Pacha Marrakech, a trendy club that plays house and electro house music. It also has two large cinema complexes, Le Colisée à Gueliz and Cinéma Rif, and a new shopping precinct, Al Mazar.

Trade and crafts are extremely important to the local tourism-fueled economy. There are 18 souks in Marrakesh, employing over 40,000 people in pottery, copperware, leather and other crafts. The souks contain a massive range of items from plastic sandals to Palestinian-style scarves imported from India or China. Local boutiques are adept at making western-style clothes using Moroccan materials. The Birmingham Post comments: "The souk offers an incredible shopping experience with a myriad of narrow winding streets that lead through a series of smaller markets clustered by trade. Through the squawking chaos of the poultry market, the gory fascination of the open-air butchers' shops and the uncountable number of small and specialist traders, just wandering around the streets can pass an entire day." Marrakesh has several supermarkets including Marjane Acima, Asswak Salam and Carrefour, and three major shopping centres, Al Mazar Mall, Plaza Marrakech and Marjane Square; a branch of Carrefour opened in Al Mazar Mall in 2010. Industrial production in the city is centred in the neighbourhood of Sidi Ghanem Al Massar, containing large factories, workshops, storage depots and showrooms. Ciments Morocco, a subsidiary of a major Italian cement firm, has a factory in Marrakech. The AeroExpo Marrakech International Exhibition of aeronautical industries and services is held here, as is the Riad Art Expo.

Marrakesh is one of North Africa's largest centers of wildlife trade, despite the illegality of most of this trade. Much of this trade can be found in the medina and adjacent squares. Tortoises are particularly popular for sale as pets, and Barbary macaques and snakes can also be seen. The majority of these animals suffer from poor welfare conditions in these stalls.

Politics

Marrakesh, the regional capital, constitutes a prefecture-level administrative unit of Morocco, Marrakech Prefecture, forming part of the region of Marrakech-Safi. Marrakesh is a major centre for law and jurisdiction in Morocco and most of the major courts of the region are here. These include the regional Court of Appeal, the Commercial Court, the Administrative Court, the Court of First Instance, the Court of Appeal of Commerce, and the Administrative Court of Appeal. Numerous organizations of the region are based here, including the regional government administrative offices, the Regional Council of Tourism office, and regional public maintenance organisations such as the Governed Autonomous Water Supply and Electricity and Maroc Telecom.

Testament to Marrakesh's development as a modern city, on 12 June 2009, Fatima-Zahra Mansouri, a then 33-year-old lawyer and daughter of a former assistant to the local authority chief in Marrakesh, was elected the first female mayor of the city, defeating outgoing Mayor Omar Jazouli by 54 votes to 35 in a municipal council vote. Mansouri became the second woman in the history of Morocco to obtain a mayoral position, after Asma Chaabi, mayor of Essaouira and was elected to serve as Marrakech's mayor for a second term in September 2021.

Since the legislative elections in November 2011, the ruling political party in Marrakesh has, for the first time, been the Justice and Development Party or PDJ which also rules at the national level. The party, which advocates Islamism and Islamic democracy, won five seats; the National Rally of Independents (RNI) took one seat, while the PAM won three.  In the partial legislative elections for the Guéliz Ennakhil constituency in October 2012, the PDJ under the leadership of Ahmed El Moutassadik was again declared the winner with 10,452 votes. The PAM, largely consisting of friends of King Mohammed VI, came in second place with 9,794 votes.

Landmarks

Jemaa el-Fnaa

The Jemaa el-Fnaa is one of the best-known squares in Africa and is the center of city activity and trade. It has been described as a "world-famous square", "a metaphorical urban icon, a bridge between the past and the present, the place where (spectacularized) Moroccan tradition encounters modernity." It has been part of the UNESCO World Heritage site since 1985. The square's name has several possible meanings; the most plausible etymology endorsed by historians is that it meant "ruined mosque" or "mosque of annihilation", referring to the construction of a mosque within the square in the late 16th century that was left unfinished and fell into ruin. The square was originally an open space for markets located on the east side of the Ksar el-Hajjar, the main fortress and palace of the Almoravid dynasty who founded Marrakesh. Following the takeover of the city by the Almohads, a new royal palace complex was founded to the south of the city (the Kasbah) and the old Almoravid palace was abandoned, but the market square remained. Subsequently, with the fluctuating fortunes of the city, Jemaa el-Fnaa saw periods of decline and renewal.

Historically this square was used for public executions by rulers who sought to maintain their power by frightening the public. The square attracted dwellers from the surrounding desert and mountains to trade here, and stalls were raised in the square from early in its history. The square attracted tradesmen, snake charmers ("wild, dark, frenzied men with long disheveled hair falling over their naked shoulders"), dancing boys of the Chleuh Atlas tribe, and musicians playing pipes, tambourines and African drums. Today the square attracts people from a diversity of social and ethnic backgrounds and tourists from all around the world. Snake charmers, acrobats, magicians, mystics, musicians, monkey trainers, herb sellers, story-tellers, dentists, pickpockets, and entertainers in medieval garb still populate the square.

Souks

Marrakesh has the largest traditional market in Morocco and the image of the city is closely associated with its souks. Historically the souks of Marrakesh were divided into retail areas for particular goods such as leather, carpets, metalwork and pottery. These divisions still roughly exist with significant overlap. Many of the souks sell items like carpets and rugs, traditional Muslim attire, leather bags, and lanterns. Haggling is still a very important part of trade in the souks.

One of the largest souks is Souk Semmarine, which sells everything from brightly coloured bejewelled sandals and slippers and leather pouffes to jewellery and kaftans. Souk Ableuh contains stalls which specialize in lemons, chilis, capers, pickles, green, red, and black olives, and mint, a common ingredient of Moroccan cuisine and tea. Similarly, Souk Kchacha specializes in dried fruit and nuts, including dates, figs, walnuts, cashews and apricots. Rahba Qedima contains stalls selling hand-woven baskets, natural perfumes, knitted hats, scarves, tee shirts, Ramadan tea, ginseng, and alligator and iguana skins. The Criée Berbère, to the northeast of this market, is noted for its dark Berber carpets and rugs. Souk Siyyaghin is known for its jewellery, and Souk Smata nearby is noted for its extensive collection of babouches and belts. Souk Cherratine specializes in leatherware, and Souk Belaarif sells modern consumer goods. Souk Haddadine specializes in ironware and lanterns. The Medina is also famous for its street food. Mechoui Alley is particularly famous for selling slow-roasted lamb dishes. The Ensemble Artisanal, located near the Koutoubia Mosque, is a government-run complex of small arts and crafts which offers a range of leather goods, textiles and carpets. Young apprentices are taught a range of crafts in the workshop at the back of this complex.

City walls and gates

The ramparts of Marrakesh, which stretch for some  around the medina of the city, were built by the Almoravids in the 12th century as protective fortifications. The Berber name Agnaou, like Gnaoua, refers to people of Sub-Saharan African origin (cf. Akal-n-iguinawen – land of the black). The gate was called Bab al Kohl (the word kohl also meaning "black") or Bab al Qsar (palace gate) in some historical sources. The corner-pieces are embellished with floral decorations. This ornamentation is framed by three panels marked with an inscription from the Quran in Maghrebi script using foliated Kufic letters, which were also used in Al-Andalus. Bab Agnaou was renovated and its opening reduced in size during the rule of sultan Mohammed ben Abdallah.

The medina has at least eight main historic gates: Bab Doukkala, Bab el-Khemis, Bab ad-Debbagh, Bab Aylan, Bab Aghmat, Bab er-Robb, Bab el-Makhzen and Bab el-'Arissa. These date back to the 12th century during the Almoravid period and many have them have been modified since. Bab Doukkala (in the northwestern part of the city wall) is in general more massive and less ornamented than the other gates; it takes its name from Doukkala area on the Atlantic coast, well to the north of Marrakesh. Bab el-Khemis is in the medina's northeastern corner and is named for the open-air Thursday market (Souq el Khemis). It is one of the city's main gates and features a man-made spring. Bab ad-Debbagh, to the east, has one of the most complex layouts of any gate, with an interior passage that turns multiple times. Bab Aylan is located slightly further south of it. Bab Aghmat is one of the city's main southern gates, located east of the Jewish and Muslim cemeteries and near the tomb of Ali ibn Yusuf. Bab er Robb is the other main southern exit from the city, located near Bab Agnaou. It has a curious position and layout which may be the result of multiple modifications to the surrounding area over the years. It provides access to roads leading to the mountain towns of Amizmiz and Asni.

Gardens

The city is home to a number of gardens, both historical and modern. The largest and oldest gardens in the city are the Menara gardens to the west and the Agdal Gardens to the south. The Menara Gardens were established in 1157 by the Almohad ruler Abd al-Mu'min. They are centered around a large water reservoir surrounded by orchards and olive groves. A 19th-century pavilion stands at the edge of the reservoir. The Agdal Gardens were established during the reign of Abu Ya'qub Yusuf (r. 1163–1184) and extend over a larger area today, containing several water basins and palace structures. The water reservoirs for both gardens were supplied with water through an old hydraulic system known as khettaras, which conveyed water from the foothills of the nearby Atlas Mountains.

The Majorelle Garden, on Avenue Yacoub el Mansour, was at one time the home of the landscape painter Jacques Majorelle. Famed designer Yves Saint Laurent bought and restored the property, which features a stele erected in his memory, and the Museum of Islamic Art, which is housed in a dark blue building. The garden, open to the public since 1947, has a large collection of plants from five continents including cacti, palms and bamboo.

The Koutoubia Mosque is also flanked by another set of gardens, the Koutoubia Gardens. They feature orange and palm trees, and are frequented by storks. The Mamounia Gardens, more than 100 years old and named after Prince Moulay Mamoun, have olive and orange trees as well as a variety of floral displays. In 2016, artist André Heller opened the acclaimed garden ANIMA near Ourika, which combines a large collection of plants, palms, bamboo and cacti as well as works by Keith Haring, Auguste Rodin, Hans Werner Geerdts and other artists.

Palaces and Riads

The historic wealth of the city is manifested in palaces, mansions and other lavish residences. The best-known palaces today are the El Badi Palace and the Bahia Palace, as well as the main Royal Palace which is still in use as one of the official residences of the King of Morocco. Riads (Moroccan mansions, historically designating a type of garden) are common in Marrakesh. Based on the design of the Roman villa, they are characterized by an open central garden courtyard surrounded by high walls. This construction provided the occupants with privacy and lowered the temperature within the building. Numerous riads and historic residences exist through the old city, with the oldest documented examples dating back to the Saadian period (16th-17th centuries), while many others date from the 19th and 20th centuries.

Mosques

The Koutoubia Mosque is one of the largest and most famous mosques in the city, located southwest of Jemaa el-Fnaa. The mosque was founded in 1147 by the Almohad caliph Abd al-Mu'min. A second version of the mosque was entirely rebuilt by Abd al-Mu'min around 1158, with Ya'qub al-Mansur possibly finalizing construction of the minaret around 1195. This second mosque is the structure that stands today. It is considered a major example of Almohad architecture and of Moroccan mosque architecture generally. It likely influenced other buildings such as the Giralda of Seville and the Hassan Tower of Rabat.

Ben Youssef Mosque is named after the Almoravid sultan Ali ibn Yusuf, who built the original mosque in the 12th century to serve as the city's main Friday mosque. After being abandoned during the Almohad period and falling into ruin, it was rebuilt in the 1560s by Abdallah al-Ghalib and then completely rebuilt again Moulay Sliman at the beginning of the 19th century. The 16th-century Ben Youssef Madrasa is located next to it. Also next to it is the Koubba Ba’adiyn or Almoravid Koubba, a rare architectural remnant of the Almoravid period which was excavated and restored in the 20th century. The Koubba, a domed kiosk structure, demonstrates a sophisticated style and is an important indication of the art and architecture of the period.

The Kasbah Mosque overlooks Place Moulay Yazid in the Kasbah district of Marrakesh, close to the El Badi Palace. It was built by the Almohad caliph Yaqub al-Mansour in the late 12th century to serve as the main mosque of the kasbah (citadel) where he and his high officials resided. It contended with the Koutoubia Mosque for prestige and the decoration of its minaret was highly influential in subsequent Moroccan architecture. The mosque was repaired by the Saadi sultan Moulay Abdallah al-Ghalib following a devastating explosion at a nearby gunpowder reserve in the second half of the 16th century. Notably, the Saadian Tombs were built just outside its southern wall in this period.

Among the other notable mosques of the city is the 14th-century Ben Salah Mosque, located east of the medina centre. It is one of the only major Marinid-era monuments in the city. The Mouassine Mosque (also known as the Al Ashraf Mosque) was built by the Saadian sultan Abdallah al-Ghalib between 1562–63 and 1572–73. It was part of a larger architectural complex which included a library, hammam (public bathhouse), and a madrasa (school). The complex also included a large ornate street fountain known as the Mouassine Fountain, which still exists today. The Bab Doukkala Mosque, built around the same time further west, has a similar layout and style as the Mouassine Mosque. Both the Mouassine and Bab Doukkala mosques appear to have been originally designed to anchor the development of new neighbourhoods after the relocation of the Jewish district from this area to the new mellah near the Kasbah.

Tombs

One of the most famous funerary monuments in the city is the Saadian Tombs, which were built in the 16th century as a royal necropolis for the Saadian Dynasty. It is located next to the south wall of the Kasbah Mosque. The necropolis contains the tombs of many Saadian rulers including Muhammad al-Shaykh, Abdallah al-Ghalib, and Ahmad al-Mansur, as well as various family members and later sultans. It consists of two main structures, each with several rooms, standing within a garden enclosure. The most important graves are marked by horizontal tombstones of finely carved marble, while others are merely covered in colorful zellij tiles. Al-Mansur's mausoleum chamber is especially rich in decoration, with a roof of carved and painted cedar wood supported on twelve columns of carrara marble, and with walls decorated with geometric patterns in zellij tilework and vegetal motifs in carved stucco. The chamber next to it, originally a prayer room equipped with a mihrab, was later repurposed as a mausoleum for members of the Alaouite dynasty.

The city also holds the tombs of many Sufi figures. Of these, there are seven patron saints of the city, which are visited every year by pilgrims during the seven-day ziara pilgrimage. During this time pilgrims visit the tombs in the following order: Sidi Yusuf ibn Ali Sanhaji, Sidi al-Qadi Iyyad al-Yahsubi, Sidi Bel Abbas, Sidi Mohamed ibn Sulayman al-Jazouli, Sidi Abdellaziz Tabba'a, Sidi Abdellah al-Ghazwani, and lastly, Sidi Abderrahman al-Suhayli. Many of these mausoleums also serve as the focus of their own zawiyas (Sufi religious complexes with mosques), including: the Zawiya and mosque of Sidi Bel Abbes (the most important of them), the Zawiya of al-Jazuli, the Zawiya of Sidi Abdellaziz, the Zawiya of Sidi Yusuf ibn Ali, and the Zawiya of Sidi al-Ghazwani (also known as Moulay el-Ksour).

Mellah
The Mellah of Marrakesh is the old Jewish Quarter (Mellah) of the city, and is located in the kasbah area of the city's medina, east of Place des Ferblantiers. It was created in 1558 by the Saadians at the site where the sultan's stables were. At the time, the Jewish community consisted of a large portion of the city's tailors, metalworkers, bankers, jewelers, and sugar traders. During the 16th century, the Mellah had its own fountains, gardens, synagogues and souks. Until the arrival of the French in 1912, Jews could not own property outside of the Mellah; all growth was consequently contained within the limits of the neighborhood, resulting in narrow streets, small shops and higher residential buildings. The Mellah, today reconfigured as a mainly residential zone renamed Hay Essalam, currently occupies an area smaller than its historic limits and has an almost entirely Muslim population. The Slat al-Azama Synagogue (or Lazama Synagogue), built around a central courtyard, is in the Mellah. The Jewish cemetery here is the largest of its kind in Morocco. Characterized by white-washed tombs and sandy graves, the cemetery is within the Medina on land adjacent to the Mellah. According to the World Jewish Congress there were only 250 Moroccan Jews remaining in Marakesh.

Hotels

As one of the principal tourist cities in Africa, Marrakesh has over 400 hotels. Mamounia Hotel is a five-star hotel in the Art Deco-Moroccan fusion style, built in 1925 by Henri Prost and A. Marchis. It is considered the most eminent hotel of the city and has been described as the "grand dame of Marrakesh hotels." The hotel has hosted numerous internationally renowned people including Winston Churchill, Prince Charles and Mick Jagger. Churchill used to relax within the gardens of the hotel and paint there. The 231-room hotel, which contains a casino, was refurbished in 1986 and again in 2007 by French designer Jacques Garcia. Other hotels include Eden Andalou Hotel, Hotel Marrakech, Sofitel Marrakech, Palm Plaza Hotel & Spa, Royal Mirage Hotel, Piscina del Hotel, and Palmeraie Palace at the Palmeraie Rotana Resort. In March 2012, Accor opened its first Pullman-branded hotel in Marrakech, Pullman Marrakech Palmeraie Resort & Spa. Set in a  olive grove at La Palmeraie, the hotel has 252 rooms, 16 suites, six restaurants and a  conference room.

Culture
Museums
Marrakech Museum

The Marrakech Museum, housed in the Dar Menebhi Palace in the old city centre, was built at the beginning of the 20th century by Mehdi Menebhi. The palace was carefully restored by the Omar Benjelloun Foundation and converted into a museum in 1997. The house itself represents an example of classical Andalusian architecture, with fountains in the central courtyard, traditional seating areas, a hammam and intricate tilework and carvings. It has been cited as having "an orgy of stalactite stucco-work" which "drips from the ceiling and combines with a mind-boggling excess of zellij work." The museum holds exhibits of both modern and traditional Moroccan art together with fine examples of historical books, coins and pottery produced by Moroccan Jewish, Berber and Arab peoples.

Dar Si Said Museum
Dar Si Said Museum, also known as the Museum of Moroccan Arts is to the north of the Bahia Palace. It was the mansion of Si Said, brother to Grand Vizier Ba Ahmad, and was constructed at the same time as Ahmad's own Bahia Palace. The collection of the museum is considered to be one of the finest in Morocco, with "jewellery from the High Atlas, the Anti Atlas and the extreme south; carpets from the Haouz and the High Atlas; oil lamps from Taroudannt; blue pottery from Safi and green pottery from Tamegroute; and leatherwork from Marrakesh." Among its oldest and most significant artifacts is an early 11th-century marble basin from the late caliphal period of Cordoba, Spain.

Berber Museum
The former home and villa of Jacques Majorelle, a blue-coloured building within the Majorelle Gardens, was converted into the Berber Museum (Musée Pierre Bergé des Arts Berbères) in 2011, after previously serving as a museum of Islamic art. It exhibits a variety of objects of Amazigh (Berber) culture from across different regions of Morocco.

 Other museums 
The House of Photography of Marrakech, opened by Patrick Menac’h and Hamid Mergani in 2009, holds exhibits of vintage Moroccan photography from the 1870s to 1950s. It is housed in a renovated traditional house in the medina. The Mouassine Museum, by the same owners, consists of a historic 16th–17th-century house in the Mouassine neighbourhood, formerly inhabited by the family of painter , which was opened as a museum and cultural venue in 2014 and since 2020 has also served a museum of Moroccan music (Musée de la Musique), in addition to hosting musical performances.

Elsewhere in the medina, the Dar El Bacha hosts the Musée des Confluences, which opened in 2017. The museum holds temporary exhibits highlighting different facets of Moroccan culture as well as various art objects from different cultures across the world. The Tiskiwin Museum is housed in another restored medina mansion and features a collection of artifacts from across the former the trans-Saharan trade routes that were connected to the city. Various other small and often privately owned museums also exist in the medina, such as the Musée Boucharouite and the Perfume Museum (Musée du Parfum). Dar Bellarj, an arts center located in a former mansion next to the Ben Youssef Mosque, also occasionally hosts art exhibits.

A number of art galleries and museums are also found outside the medina, in Gueliz and its surrounding districts in the new city. The Museum of Art and Culture of Marrakesh (MACMA), opened in 2016, houses a collection of Moroccan art objects and photography from the 1870s to 1970s. Since 2019, its collection of Orientalist paintings are now housed at its sister museum, the Orientalist Museum in the medina. The Museum of African Contemporary Art Al Maaden (MACAAL) is a non-profit art gallery that exhibits contemporary Moroccan and African art. The Yves Saint Laurent Museum, opened in 2017 in a new building near the Jardin Majorelle, displays a collection of work spanning the career of French fashion designer Yves Saint Laurent. It is a sister museum to the Yves Saint Laurent Museum in Paris.

Music, theatre and dance
Two types of music are traditionally associated with Marrakesh. Berber music is influenced by Andalusian classical music and typified by its oud accompaniment. By contrast, Gnaoua music is loud and funky with a sound reminiscent of the Blues. It is performed on handmade instruments such as castanets, ribabs (three-stringed banjos) and deffs (handheld drums). Gnaoua music's rhythm and crescendo take the audience into a mood of trance; the style is said to have emerged in Marrakesh and Essaouira as a ritual of deliverance from slavery. More recently, several Marrakesh female music groups have also risen to popularity.

The Théâtre Royal de Marrakesh, the Institut Français and Dar Chérifa are major performing arts institutions in the city. The Théâtre Royal, built by Tunisian architect Charles Boccara, puts on theatrical performances of comedy, opera, and dance in French and Arabic. A greater number of theatrical troupes perform outdoors and entertain tourists on the main square and the streets, especially at night.

Crafts

The arts and crafts of Marrakesh have had a wide and enduring impact on Moroccan handicrafts to the present day. Riad décor is widely used in carpets and textiles, ceramics, woodwork, metal work and zelij. Carpets and textiles are weaved, sewn or embroidered, sometimes used for upholstering. Moroccan women who practice craftsmanship are known as Maalems (expert craftspeople) and make such fine products as Berber carpets and shawls made of sabra (another name for rayon, also sometimes called cactus silk). Ceramics are in monochrome Berber-style only, a limited tradition depicting bold forms and decorations.

Wood crafts are generally made of cedar, including the riad doors and palace ceilings. Orange wood is used for making ladles known as harira (lentil soup ladles). Thuya craft products are made of caramel coloured thuya, a conifer indigenous to Morocco. Since this species is almost extinct, these trees are being replanted and promoted by the artists' cooperative Femmes de Marrakech.

Metalwork made in Marrakesh includes brass lamps, iron lanterns, candle holders made from recycled sardine tins, and engraved brass teapots and tea trays used in the traditional serving of tea. Contemporary art includes sculpture and figurative paintings. Blue veiled Tuareg figurines and calligraphy paintings are also popular.

Festivals
Festivals, both national and Islamic, are celebrated in Marrakesh and throughout the country, and some of them are observed as national holidays. Cultural festivals of note held in Marrakesh include the National Folklore Festival, the Marrakech Festival of Popular Arts (in which a variety of famous Moroccan musicians and artists participate), international folklore festival Marrakech Folklore Days and the Berber Festival. The International Film Festival of Marrakech, which aspires to be the North African version of the Cannes Film Festival, was established in 2001. The festival, which showcases over 100 films from around the world annually, has attracted Hollywood stars such as Martin Scorsese, Francis Ford Coppola, Susan Sarandon, Jeremy Irons, Roman Polanski and many European, Arab and Indian film stars. The Marrakech Bienniale was established in 2004 by Vanessa Branson as a cultural festival in various disciplines, including visual arts, cinema, video, literature, performing arts, and architecture.

Food

Surrounded by lemon, orange, and olive groves, the city's culinary characteristics are rich and heavily spiced but not hot, using various preparations of Ras el hanout (which means "Head of the shop"), a blend of dozens of spices which include ash berries, chilli, cinnamon, grains of paradise, monk's pepper, nutmeg, and turmeric. A specialty of the city and the symbol of its cuisine is tanjia marrakshia, affectionately referred to as bint ar-rimad ( "daughter of the ash"), a local meal prepared with beef meat, spices, and smen and slow-cooked in a ceramic pot in traditional oven in hot ashes. Tajines can be prepared with chicken, lamb, beef or fish, adding fruit, olives and preserved lemon, vegetables and spices, including cumin, peppers, saffron, turmeric, and ras el hanout. The meal is prepared in a tajine pot and slow-cooked with steam. Another version of tajine includes vegetables and chickpeas seasoned with flower petals. Tajines may also be basted with "smen" Moroccan ghee that has a flavour similar to blue cheese.

Shrimp, chicken and lemon-filled briouats are another traditional specialty of Marrakesh. Rice is cooked with saffron, raisins, spices, and almonds, while couscous may have added vegetables. A pastilla is a filo-wrapped pie stuffed with minced chicken or pigeon that has been prepared with almonds, cinnamon, spices and sugar. Harira soup in Marrakesh typically includes lamb with a blend of chickpeas, lentils, vermicelli, and tomato paste, seasoned with coriander, spices and parsley. Kefta (mince meat), liver in crépinette, merguez and tripe stew are commonly sold at the stalls of Jemaa el-Fnaa.

The desserts of Marrakesh include chebakia (sesame spice cookies usually prepared and served during Ramadan), tartlets of filo dough with dried fruit, or cheesecake with dates.

The Moroccan tea culture is practiced in Marrakesh; green tea with mint is served with sugar from a curved teapot spout into small glasses. Another popular non-alcoholic drink is orange juice. Under the Almoravids, alcohol consumption was common; historically, hundreds of Jews produced and sold alcohol in the city. In the present day, alcohol is sold in some hotel bars and restaurants.

Education

Marrakesh has several universities and schools, including Cadi Ayyad University (also known as the University of Marrakech), and its component, the École nationale des sciences appliquées de Marrakech (ENSA Marrakech), which was created in 2000 by the Ministry of Higher Education and specializes in engineering and scientific research, and the La faculté des sciences et techniques-gueliz which known to be number one in Morocco in its kind of faculties.  Cadi Ayyad University was established in 1978 and operates 13 institutions in the Marrakech Tensift Elhaouz and Abda Doukkala regions of Morocco in four main cities, including Kalaa of Sraghna, Essaouira and Safi in addition to Marrakech. Sup de Co Marrakech, also known as the École Supérieure de Commerce de Marrakech, is a private four-year college that was founded in 1987 by Ahmed Bennis. The school is affiliated with the École Supérieure de Commerce of Toulouse, France; since 1995 the school has built partnership programs with numerous American universities including the University of Delaware, University of St. Thomas, Oklahoma State University, National-Louis University, and Temple University. 

Ben Youssef Madrasa

The Ben Youssef Madrasa, north of the Medina, was an Islamic college in Marrakesh named after the Almoravid sultan Ali ibn Yusuf (1106–1142) who expanded the city and its influence considerably. It is the largest madrasa in all of Morocco and was one of the largest theological colleges in North Africa, at one time housing as many as 900 students.

The college, which was affiliated with the neighbouring Ben Youssef Mosque, was founded during the Marinid dynasty in the 14th century by Sultan Abu al-Hassan.

This education complex specialized in Quranic law and was linked to similar institutions in Fez, Taza, Salé, and Meknes. The Madrasa was re-constructed by the Saadian Sultan Abdallah al-Ghalib (1557–1574) in 1564 as the largest and most prestigious madrasa in Morocco. The construction ordered by Abdallah al-Ghalib was completed in 1565, as attested by the inscription in the prayer room. Its 130 student dormitory cells cluster around a courtyard richly carved in cedar, marble and stucco. In accordance with Islam, the carvings contain no representation of humans or animals, consisting entirely of inscriptions and geometric patterns. One of the school's best known teachers was Mohammed al-Ifrani (1670–1745). After a temporary closure beginning in 1960, the building was refurbished and reopened to the public as a historical site in 1982.

Sports
Football clubs based in Marrakesh include Najm de Marrakech, KAC Marrakech, Mouloudia de Marrakech and Chez Ali Club de Marrakech. The city contains the Circuit International Automobile Moulay El Hassan a race track which hosts the World Touring Car Championship and from 2017 FIA Formula E. The Marrakech Marathon is also held here. Roughly 5000 runners turn out for the event annually. Also, here takes place Grand Prix Hassan II tennis tournament (on clay) part of ATP World Tour series.

Golf is a popular sport in Marrakech. The city has three golf courses just outside the city limits and played almost through the year. The three main courses are the Golf de Amelikis on the road to Ourazazate, the Palmeraie Golf Palace near the Palmeraie, and the Royal Golf Club, the oldest of the three courses.

Jnan Amar Polo Club is located in Tameslouht, near Marrakech.

Transport
 Bus 

BRT Marrakesh, a bus rapid transit system using trolleybuses was opened in 2017.

 Rail 

The Marrakesh railway station is linked by several trains running daily to other major cities in Morocco such as Casablanca, Tangiers, Fez, Meknes and Rabat. The Casablanca–Tangier high-speed rail line opened in November 2018.

In 2015, a tramway was proposed.

 Road 
The main road network within and around Marrakesh is well paved. The major highway connecting Marrakesh with Casablanca to the south is A7, a toll expressway,  in length. The road from Marrakesh to Settat, a  stretch, was inaugurated by King Mohammed VI in April 2007, completing the  highway to Tangiers. Highway A7 connects also Marrakesh to Agadir,  to the south-west.

 Air 

It is an international facility that receives several European flights as well as flights from Casablanca and several Arab nations. It has two formal passenger terminals; these are more or less combined into one large terminal. A third terminal is being built. The airport has parking space for 14 Boeing 737 and four Boeing 747 aircraft. The separate freight terminal has  of covered space.

Healthcare
Marrakesh has long been an important centre for healthcare in Morocco, and the regional rural and urban populations alike are reliant upon hospitals in the city. The psychiatric hospital installed by the Merinid Caliph Ya'qub al-Mansur in the 16th century was described by the historian 'Abd al-Wahfd al- Marrakushi as one of the greatest in the world at the time. A strong Andalusian influence was evident in the hospital, and many of the physicians to the Caliphs came from places such as Seville, Zaragoza and Denia in eastern Spain.

A severe strain has been placed upon the healthcare facilities of the city in the last decade as the city population has grown dramatically. Ibn Tofail University Hospital is one of the major hospitals of the city. In February 2001, the Moroccan government signed a loan agreement worth eight million U.S. dollars with The OPEC Fund for International Development to help improve medical services in and around Marrakesh, which led to expansions of the Ibn Tofail and Ibn Nafess hospitals.

In 2009, king Mohammed VI inaugurated a regional psychiatric hospital in Marrakesh, built by the Mohammed V Foundation for Solidarity, costing 22 million dirhams (approximately 2.7 million U.S. dollars).
Mohammed VI has also announced plans for the construction of a 450 million dirham military hospital in Marrakesh.

International relations

Marrakesh is twinned with:

  Granada, Spain
  Marseille, France
  Ningbo, China
  Scottsdale, United States
  Sousse, Tunisia
  Timbuktu, Mali

Notable people

Abdelali Mhamdi - footballer
Abdellah Jlaidi - footballer
Salaheddine Saidi - footballer
Tahar Tamsamani - Former boxer
Hasna Benhassi - Former middle-distance runner
Adil Ramzi - Former footballer
Ahmed Bahja - Former footballer
Tahar El Khalej - Former footballer

See also

 Arab Astronomical Society (2016)
 List of people from Marrakesh
 Marrakesh in popular culture

References

Bibliography

 
 
 
 
 
 
 
 
 
 
 
 
 
 
 
 
 
 
 
 
 
 
 
 
 
 
 
 
 
 
 
 
 
 
 
 
 
 
 
 
 
 
 
 
 
 
 
 
 
 
 
 
 
 
 Tast, Brigitte (2020). Die rote Stadt; in: Brigitte Tast: Rot in Schwarz-Weiß'', Schellerten, S. 47ff.

Further reading

External links

 Parliament of Morocco
 Moroccan National Tourist Office
Best Places To Visit in Marrakesh, Morocco

 
Prefecturial capitals in Morocco
Regional capitals in Morocco
1062 establishments
11th-century establishments in Africa
Populated places established in the 11th century
Former capitals of Morocco